Southeastern Regional Transit Authority (SRTA) is a public transport authority in Bristol County and Plymouth County, Massachusetts. It serves 10 municipalities in Massachusetts' South Coast region: Acushnet, Dartmouth, Fairhaven, Fall River, Freetown, Mattapoisett, New Bedford, Somerset, Swansea, and Westport. Fixed-route bus services are offered to serve the cities of Fall River and New Bedford.

Funding sources 
SRTA gets funding from a number of sources, including federal, state, local and farebox revenue. As of Fiscal Year 2019, the majority of SRTA's funding came from the federal government, after that being state, local and farebox revenue.

Route list

New Bedford
Route 1 - Fort Rodman
Route 2 - Lund's Corner 
Route 3 - Dartmouth St via St. Luke's Hospital & Stop and Shop
Route 4 - Ashley Blvd. 
Route 5 - South Central (PriceRite)
Route 6 - Shawmut Avenue via Rockdale West
Route 8 - Mt. Pleasant St. via Fieldstone Marketplace
Route 9 - New Bedford - Fall River via Dartmouth Mall & UMass Dartmouth
Route 9X - Intercity Express (New Bedford - Fall River) via I-195
Route 10 - Dartmouth Mall via Hawthorn Medical Center
Route 11 - Fairhaven/Walmart via Market Basket
New Bedford North End Shuttle
New Bedford/Wareham Connection Shuttle

Fall River
Route 1 - South Main St. via Shove St.
Route 2 - North Main Street
Route 3 - Laurel Street/Shopping Center
Route 4 - Robeson St./Catholic Memorial Home 
Route 5 - Stafford Rd. via Southcoast Marketplace
Route 6 - Pleasant St./Walmart
Route 7 - Bay Street 
Route 8 - Durfee High/BCC via New Boston Rd. 
Route 9 - Bedford St. 
Route 10 - Rodman St./Walmart 
Route 14 - Swansea Mall/Walmart via Route 6
Route 9 (From New Bedford) - Fall River to New Bedford via UMass Dartmouth & Dartmouth Mall
Route 9X (From New Bedford) - Intercity Express (Fall River to New Bedford) via I-195

References

External links

Southeastern Regional Transit Authority.

New Bedford, Massachusetts
State agencies of Massachusetts
Bus transportation in Massachusetts
Transportation in Bristol County, Massachusetts